Arasu vidumurai is an upcoming Tamil Romance film written and directed by C. Balasubramaniyam. The film stars Rajesh, Elumalai, Delhi Ganesh and Dr. Vincent Therraisnathan. The story of the film revolves around a small town. The film is produced by S.V. Films & CBS Cine International. It features background score and soundtrack composed by Thomas Rathnam, with cinematography handled by Anbarasu.

Cast
 Rajesh
 Swathi (of Raattinam movie fame)
 Delhi Ganesh
 Elumalai
 Dr.Vincent Therraisnathan

Production
S.V. Films & CBS Cine International

Filming
Filmed in and around Chennai, Tiruvannamalai. Gingee, Polur, Dehradun and foreign.

Released

Controversies
A few controversies happened to be about this film. Heroine was changed after a few days shooting.

Soundtrack

Thomas Rathnam composed the soundtrack. Director Balasubramaniyam had chosen the best tunes and lyrics. The soundtrack album consist of 5 tracks. The lyrics were written by Kavi Perarasu Vairamuthu and Ka. Chezhian.

Critical reception

The soundtrack album of Arasu Vidumurai consisting of 5 songs and 1 Theme music was released on 22 June 2012 in Chennai The album received positive critic and public reviews. Sify movies, msn entertainment and ibn live gave the album a positive verdict stating that "Overall, it is a classy and refreshing album. Behindwoods gave the album a positive verdict with 3.5 out of 5 stars and mentioned "Overall it’s a good album with tracks. Thomas Rathnam had done a very good job."

References

2014 films
2010s Tamil-language films